Laurence Mason is an American stage, film and television actor. He is best known for his roles as Lord Nikon in the 1995 film Hackers, Sammy Norino on the Fox drama Prison Break, Luis Sarria in the film Ali, Halpern White on the FX crime drama The Shield, and Earl Briggs, the chauffeur in the film The Lincoln Lawyer.

Career
Mason performed in a number of productions at the Harold Clurman Theatre and the Nuyorican Poets Café, including appearing in commercials, hip hop music videos, voice over work and  a stint on One Life to Live. His first feature film was True Romance (under Tony Scott). Soon after, he landed a role in The Crow with the late Brandon Lee and Hackers along with Angelina Jolie. He has had recurring roles on The Shield and Prison Break.

Filmography

Television

Video games

References

External links

20th-century American male actors
21st-century American male actors
American male film actors
American male stage actors
American male television actors
Living people
Year of birth missing (living people)
Place of birth missing (living people)